Four Falls of Buffalo is a 2015 documentary film produced for ESPN's 30 for 30 series and directed by Ken Rodgers of NFL Films. The film profiles the Buffalo Bills teams of the early 1990s, when the franchise became the first team to play in—and lose—four consecutive Super Bowls.

The film goes through the Bills four "Super Bowl" years featuring retrospectives and insight on such famous plays as Scott Norwood's 47-yard field goal miss at the end of Super Bowl XXV, Thurman Thomas' misplaced helmet at the start of Super Bowl XXVI, and Don Beebe's strip of Leon Lett's attempted fumble return in Super Bowl XXVII. Former Bills players Jim Kelly, Bruce Smith, Thurman Thomas, Andre Reed, Don Beebe, Darryl Talley, Steve Tasker, Scott Norwood, Frank Reich, coach Marv Levy, and general manager Bill Polian all gave extensive interviews for the film.

A highlight of the documentary is an emotional interview with Norwood and former Bills special teams coach Bruce DeHaven conducted on the steps of Buffalo City Hall, the site where, twenty-five years before, the crowd of Bills fans had cheered for Norwood following his ill-fated kick.

Cast

 Jim Kelly
 Bruce Smith
 Thurman Thomas
 Andre Reed
 Scott Norwood
 Steve Tasker
 Don Beebe
 Frank Reich
 Kenneth Davis
 Darryl Talley
 Marv Levy
 Bill Polian 
 Bruce DeHaven 
 Bill Belichick 
 Chris Berman
 Tim Russert (via archival footage)
 Luke Russert 
 John Elway 
 Troy Aikman 
 Jimmy Johnson
 Andrea Kremer
 William Fichtner (Narrator)

Awards
Four Falls of Buffalo was nominated for the Outstanding Long Sports Documentary at the 37th Annual Sports Emmy Awards.

References

External links
"30 for 30 - Four Falls of Buffalo"

American sports documentary films
2015 documentary films
2015 television films
2015 films
30 for 30
Buffalo Bills
Documentary films about American football
2010s American films